Puán is a station on Line A of the Buenos Aires Underground. The station was opened on 23 December 2008 as part of the extension of the line from Primera Junta to Carabobo.

The station is the closest station to the School of Philosophy at the University of Buenos Aires.

References

External links

 http://www.buenosaires.gob.ar/subte

Buenos Aires Underground stations
Railway stations opened in 2008
2008 establishments in Argentina